Hermann Karl Bruno von François (31 January 1856 – 15 May 1933) was a German General der Infanterie during World War I, and is best known for his key role in several German victories on the Eastern Front in 1914.

Early life and military career

Born in Luxembourg to a noble family of Huguenot extraction, François was exposed to a military life from an early age. He was killed in action leading his men during the Battle of Spicheren on 6 August 1870.

François, who had enrolled as an officer cadet, was by 1875 based in Potsdam as Leutnant of the Prussian 1st Guard Regiment of Foot. From 1884 - 87, he attended the Military Academy at Berlin, and by 1889 had been promoted to Hauptmann (Captain) and had joined the General Staff.

By the early 1890s, François was posted to the XV Corps as a general staff officer based in Strasbourg. After a brief stint as company commander in 151. Infanterie-Regiment of the 31st Division, François devoted all his energies to the General Staff. In 1894 he was promoted to major and transferred to the 8th Division in Mannheim. By 1899, François was the Chief of Staff for the IV Corps, commanded by General der Infanterie Paul von Hindenburg and based in Magdeburg.

In 1901, François's mother, Marie took the family to German South-West Africa to follow her youngest son, Hugo von François who was a Hauptmann (Captain) in the Colonial Army. The family was based in the region during the Herero Wars, in which Hugo fought and died.  François' other brother, Curt von François, was a well known scientist and researcher specialising in Africa.

François was promoted to Generalleutnant in 1911 and given command of the 13th Division for a brief period before his promotion to General der Infanterie and posting to command of I Corps under the 8th Army based in Königsberg.

World War I
François began the war stationed in the province of East Prussia, where he was commander of the I Corps of the German Eighth Army. His task was to defend the easternmost regions of East Prussia against a Russian attack directed at the key city of Königsberg. The Eighth Army would be expected to hold out against significantly larger Russian forces until it could be reinforced by troops coming from the west after the expected quick defeat of France, in accordance with the Schlieffen Plan, which would guide German forces in the opening phase of a war in which Germany faced both France and Russia.

When war broke out in August 1914, François' corps faced the right wing of a two-pronged Russian invasion of East Prussia, led by Paul von Rennenkampf's Russian First Army. On 17 August the overall German theater commander, General Maximilian von Prittwitz, nervously eying the advance of the Russian left wing far to the south, ordered Von François to retreat while under heavy attack from Rennenkampf.

François, reluctant to surrender any of his beloved Prussia, and naturally pugnacious, also felt breaking off while engaged would be deadly, and so he ignored Prittwitz' order, responding with the famous reply "General von François will withdraw when he has defeated the Russians!" He counterattacked Rennenkampf's massive army, bringing on the Battle of Stalluponen, and won a surprising victory while inflicting 5,000 casualties and taking 3,000 prisoners.

After winning the battle, François obeyed Prittwitz's order and withdrew  to the west, where three days later he fought Rennenkampf to a draw at the Battle of Gumbinnen. Von François' aggressiveness resulted in the cautious Rennenkampf halting his advance westward.

 Following that battle and a change of overall commanders (Prittwitz was judged to have lost his nerve by the German High Command), François' corps was transferred by rail to the southwest, to confront the Russian Second Army advancing into southern East Prussia under the command of General Alexander Samsonov. Although not trusted by the new German commanders Paul von Hindenburg and Erich Ludendorff due to his previous disobedience, François played the decisive role in the upcoming Battle of Tannenberg. On 27 August François attacked the lead elements of Samsonov's army and began to make steady advances into their rear. Ludendorff, fearing a Russian counterattack by Rennenkampf, now ordered him to break off the advance. However, François twice ignored his direct orders and played a decisive role in the following encirclement and defeat of Samsonov's army.

When Hindenburg and Ludendorff went south to lead the 9th Army in Russian Poland,  François remained with his corps in East Prussia and led it with much success in the First Battle of the Masurian Lakes the following month. When General Richard von Schubert, the new commander of the 8th Army, ordered him to retreat, he dispatched a telegram to the OHL describing his success and stating "the Commander is badly counselled." The telegram impressed the Kaiser so much that he immediately relieved Schubert and, on 3 October, gave von François the command of the 8th Army. He did not hold it for long. When Hindenburg and Ludendorff prepared their counter-attack from Thorn in the direction of Łódź, François was reluctant to send the requested I Corps, sending the badly trained and ill-equipped XXV Reserve Corps instead. That was too much for his superiors. In early November 1914 von François was removed and replaced by General Otto von Below.

After some time spent "on the shelf", François received the command of the XXXXI Reserve Corps on 24 December 1914, and after a spell in the West, he returned to the Eastern Front in April 1915 where he took part in the Spring Offensive that conquered Russian Poland. He continued to distinguish himself. He won the Pour le Mérite, Germany's highest military decoration, on 14 May 1915 for his performance in the breakthrough at Gorlice, and had the Oak Leaves attached to it in July 1917, for outstanding performance during the Battle of Verdun. In July 1915 he was transferred back to the Western Front to take command of the Westphalian VII Corps in France, and in July 1916 Meuse Group West in the Verdun sector. However he never received any further promotion or serious commands under Ludendorff, and gave up his command in July 1918 and was placed on the standby list until October 1918 when he retired.

Post-war
After the war ended, François returned home and wrote several books on military history, including the best-seller (in Germany) Marneschlacht und Tannenberg in 1920.

Orders
 Order of the Crown, 1st class (Prussia)
 Service award (Prussia)
 Honour Commanders Cross (Ehrenkomturkreuz) of the Princely House Order of Hohenzollern
 Commander 2nd class of the House Order of Albert the Bear
 Commander First Class of the Order of the Zähringer Lion
 Military Merit Order, 2nd class (Bavaria)
 Commander First Class of the Order of Philip the Magnanimous (Hesse)
 Honour Cross First Class of the House Order of Lippe
 Honorary Cross Second Class of the Reuss Honor Cross
 Commander 2nd class of the Ducal Saxe-Ernestine House Order
 Cross of Honour of Schwarzburg, 2nd class
 Order of Merit, 1st class (Chile)
 Commander of the Order of the Redeemer (Greece)
 Commander of the Order of Saints Maurice and Lazarus (House of Savoy)
 Order of the Black Eagle
 Iron Cross of 1914, 1st and 2nd class
 Pour le Mérite with Oak Leaves
 Pour le Merite (14 May 1915)
 Oak Leaves (27 July 1917)
 Grand Cross of the Order of the Red Eagle with Oak Leaves and Swords (14 October 1918)

References

The Kaiser's Warlords: German Commanders of World War I, by Ronald Pawly, Patrice Courcelle, 2003.

1856 births
1933 deaths
People from Luxembourg City
German Army generals of World War I
Generals of Infantry (Prussia)
Recipients of the Iron Cross (1914), 1st class
Recipients of the Pour le Mérite (military class)
Commanders of the Order of Saints Maurice and Lazarus
German military writers
German male non-fiction writers